Aplosporella yalgorensis is an endophytic fungus that might be a canker pathogen, specifically for Eucalyptus gomphocephala. It was isolated from said trees in Western Australia.

The epithet of the species, yalgorensis, is derived from the name of Yalgorup National Park, meaning the type location was at 'yalgor'.

References

Further reading

External links 
MycoBank

Botryosphaeriales
Fungi described in 2009